Franck Durix (born 20 October 1965) is a French former professional footballer. He is the brother of fellow player David Durix.

Career

Club career
Beginning as an apprentice at Belleville sur Saône, Durix played professionally in France, Japan and Switzerland for Olympique Lyonnais, Cannes, Nagoya Grampus Eight, Servette and Sochaux-Montbéliard.

International career
Durix was called up to the French national squad in 1995, but never made an appearance for the national team.

External links
 Player profile at LFP

1965 births
Living people
French footballers
Olympique Lyonnais players
AS Cannes players
Servette FC players
FC Sochaux-Montbéliard players
Nagoya Grampus players
Ligue 1 players
Ligue 2 players
Swiss Super League players
French expatriate footballers
Expatriate footballers in Switzerland
Expatriate footballers in Japan
J1 League players
Association football midfielders
Sportspeople from Rhône (department)
Footballers from Auvergne-Rhône-Alpes